Xavier Chavalerin (born 7 March 1991) is a French professional footballer who plays as a central midfielder for Ligue 1 club Troyes.

Career
Chavalerin joined Tours in 2012 from Olympique Lyonnais. He made his Ligue 2 debut at 30 July 2012 against AS Monaco replacing Billy Ketkeophomphone at half-time in a 4–0 away loss.

In July 2015, Chavalerin joined newly promoted team Red Star.

Chavalerin helped Stade de Reims win the 2017–18 Ligue 2, helping promote them to the Ligue 1 for the 2018–19 season.

On 29 August 2021, he joined Troyes on a three-year contract.

Career statistics

References

External links

Xavier Chavalerin foot-national.com Profile

1991 births
Living people
People from Villeurbanne
Sportspeople from Lyon Metropolis
Association football midfielders
French footballers
Olympique Lyonnais players
Tours FC players
Red Star F.C. players
Stade de Reims players
ES Troyes AC players
Ligue 1 players
Ligue 2 players
Footballers from Auvergne-Rhône-Alpes